Royce Khalil O'Neale  (born June 5, 1993) is an American professional basketball player for the Brooklyn Nets of the National Basketball Association (NBA). He played college basketball for the Denver Pioneers and the Baylor Bears.

College career
O'Neale, a small forward from Killeen, Texas, was recruited to the University of Denver out of Harker Heights High School. He played two seasons for the Pioneers, including an all-Western Athletic Conference (WAC) season in 2012-13, before transferring to Baylor University in 2013. Because he transferred to be closer to his family and ailing grandfather, the National Collegiate Athletic Association (NCAA) granted him a waiver to transfer rules, making him immediately eligible to play for the Bears instead of sitting out the customary year.

Professional career

Riesen Ludwigsburg (2015–2016)
Following the close of his college career, O'Neale was not selected in the 2015 NBA draft. He played his first professional season in Germany for MHP Riesen Ludwigsburg, where he averaged 8.1 points and 4.5 rebounds per game.

Gran Canaria (2016–2017)
After playing for the Golden State Warriors' Summer League team in 2016, he signed with Spanish club Herbalife Gran Canaria for the 2016–17 season.

Utah Jazz (2017–2022)
On June 25, 2017, O'Neale signed with Lithuanian club Žalgiris Kaunas. However, he never played a game for the team.

After playing for the Utah Jazz in the 2017 NBA Summer League, he was signed to the team for the 2017–18 season due to the exception left in the contract with Žalgiris Kaunas. O'Neale made his NBA debut on October 21, 2017, playing a single minute in their 96–87 win against the Oklahoma City Thunder.  On February 14, 2018, he scored 19 points in a home game against the Phoenix Suns. 

After the game on November 12, 2019 against the Brooklyn Nets, O’Neale traded jerseys with former Baylor Bears teammate Taurean Prince.

On January 19, 2020, the Utah Jazz announced that they had signed O’Neale to a contract extension.

Brooklyn Nets (2022–present)
On June 30, 2022, O'Neale was traded to the Brooklyn Nets in exchange for a 2023 first-round draft pick. On November 17, O'Neale put up 11 points, alongside a game-winning tip, with 10 rebounds, and 11 assists for his first career triple-double in a 109–107 win over the Portland Trail Blazers. 

On January 8, 2023, O'Neale put up a game-winning putback in a 102–101 win over the Miami Heat.

Career statistics

NBA

Regular season

|-
| style="text-align:left;"|
| style="text-align:left;"|Utah
| 69 || 4 || 16.7 || .423 || .356 || .803 || 3.4 || 1.4 || .5 || .2 || 5.0
|-
| style="text-align:left;"|
| style="text-align:left;"|Utah
| 82 || 16 || 20.4 || .475 || .386 || .762 || 3.5 || 1.5 || .7 || .3 || 5.2
|-
| style="text-align:left;"|
| style="text-align:left;"|Utah
| 71 || 62 || 28.9 || .433 || .377 || .764 || 5.5 || 2.5 || .8 || .5 || 6.3
|-
| style="text-align:left;"|
| style="text-align:left;"|Utah
| 71 || 71 || 31.6 || .444 || .385 || .848 || 6.8 || 2.5 || .8 || .5 || 7.0
|-
| style="text-align:left;"|
| style="text-align:left;"|Utah
| 77 || 77 || 31.2 || .457 || .389 || .804 || 4.8 || 2.5 || 1.1 || .4 || 7.4
|- class="sortbottom"
| style="text-align:center;" colspan="2"|Career
| 370 || 230 || 25.7 || .448 || .381 || .796 || 4.8 || 2.1 || .8 || .4 || 6.2

Playoffs

|-
| style="text-align:left;"|2018
| style="text-align:left;"|Utah
| 11 || 5 || 23.5 || .500 || .357 || .632 || 3.5 || 1.4 || .9 || .4 || 7.1
|-
| style="text-align:left;"|2019
| style="text-align:left;"|Utah
| 5 || 0 || 27.4 || .467 || .348 || .750 || 4.6 || 1.6 || .4 || .4 || 10.6
|-
| style="text-align:left;"|2020
| style="text-align:left;"|Utah
| 7 || 7 || 35.6 || .406 || .455 || .500 || 5.4 || 2.7 || 1.3 || .3 || 5.6
|-
| style="text-align:left;"|2021
| style="text-align:left;"|Utah
| 11 || 11 || 36.7 || .506 || .467 || .833 || 7.3 || 2.1 || 1.1 || .3 || 11.3
|-
| style="text-align:left;"|2022
| style="text-align:left;"|Utah
| 6 || 6 || 31.3 || .400 || .280 || 1.000 || 5.7 || 1.5 || .5 || .2 || 6.2
|- class="sortbottom"
| style="text-align:center;" colspan="2"|Career
| 40 || 29 || 30.9 || .470 || .399 || .698 || 5.3 || 1.9 || .9 || .3 || 8.3

References

External links

 Baylor Bears bio 
 College stats

1993 births
Living people
American expatriate basketball people in Germany
American expatriate basketball people in Spain
American men's basketball players
Basketball players from Texas
Baylor Bears men's basketball players
Brooklyn Nets players
CB Gran Canaria players
Denver Pioneers men's basketball players
Liga ACB players
Riesen Ludwigsburg players
Sportspeople from Killeen, Texas
Salt Lake City Stars players
Small forwards
Undrafted National Basketball Association players
Utah Jazz players